Matthew Jacobs (born 23 February 1985) is an English born rugby union footballer currently playing at Wing for Llandovery RFC and The Legion.

He has previously played for Llanelli RFC and the Scarlets.
He made his debut for the Scarlets in 2009 against Barbarian F.C. which he scored a try to win 40-24.

Jacobs is also a personal trainer.

References
 http://www.llanellirugby.com/Personnel.aspx?pr=178958

External links
 Llandovery RFC Profile

1985 births
Living people
English rugby union players
Llandovery RFC players
Rugby union players from Oxford
Rugby union wings